Doldim-e Bozorg (also Romanized as Doldīm-e Bozorg; also known as Doldīm) is a village in Blukat Rural District, Rahmatabad and Blukat District, Rudbar County, Gilan Province, Iran. At the 2006 census, its population was 166, in 33 families.

References 

Populated places in Rudbar County